Nexhat Agolli (Serbo-Croatian: Неџат Аголи, Nedžat Agoli) (1914–1949) was a Yugoslav Albanian jurist and politician. He served as Deputy President of the Anti-Fascist Assembly for the People's Liberation of Macedonia (ASNOM) in 1944; and, after World War II, as Minister of Social Works of Macedonia. In 1949, he was arrested for opposing Josip Broz Tito's Informbiro policies, and died while imprisoned.

Life 
Born in Debar, Kingdom of Serbia, Agolli studied in Krumë, Tirana and Rome, where he later worked as an assistant professor of law at the Sapienza University of Rome. In 1942 he joined the communist National Liberation Movement of Albania and served in Albanian and Bulgarian occupation zones of Yugoslavia (modern Montenegro, Kosovo, Serbia and Macedonia). In December 1944 he was elected deputy president of ASNOM. When the Communist Party of Yugoslavia was expelled from the Cominform in 1948, Agolli supported the pro-Soviet factions with the party. He was convicted and sent to the political prison at Goli Otok, where he died on April 28, 1949.

References 

1914 births
1949 deaths
People executed by Yugoslavia
Yugoslav politicians
Government ministers of Yugoslavia
People from Debar
Executed Yugoslav people
Executed Albanian people
Academic staff of the Sapienza University of Rome
Yugoslav communists